The US Aviation Cumulus is an American low-wing, single-seat, open cockpit motor glider that was designed by Dave Ekstrom and produced by US Aviation, supplied in kit form for amateur construction.

Design and development
The Cumulus was conceived as a lightweight motorglider for soaring and also for touring. It is a replacement of the earlier US Aviation Cloud Dancer design. The Cumulus first flew in 1995 and was named after the cumulus cloud.

Developer Dan Johnson initially outsourced aircraft engineering and production to AeroDreams, where the original kit designer / producer was Walter J. "Jim" Collie, with an assistant designing the fiberglass cabin. Initially, about eight kits were delivered, but production was halted for about four years, following a fatal accident that killed Collie and destroyed the prototype. Eyewitenesses reported hearing a loud "pop" and seeing the left wing departing the plane in flight. An NTSB investigation concluded that the probable cause was "debonding of the leading edge to spar cap joint, which resulted in inflight separation."

Johnson later conceded that "the project needed someone who understood building techniques better than I did. That man was Dave Ekstrom and he ultimately took over my design."

After 2004, the Cumulus was developed and produced for US Aviation, by Dave Ekstrom, president of Ultralight Soaring Aviation, in Bemidji, Minnesota, as the New Cumulus. According to Ekstrom, "When we completed this task, US Aviation sold us all design rights to the remainder of the aircraft as well as other assets," and Ultralight Soaring also "obtained the inventory created by AeroDreams."

Built from steel tubing (fuselage cage originally reinforced with 4130 chromoly tubing) surrounding a partially-enclosed pod, at the end of a 5-inch-diameter, seamless 6061-T6 aluminum main fuselage/tailboom tube, composites and fabric, the Cumulus is powered by a standard Rotax 447  engine in pusher configuration, although engines from  can be fitted. The dope-and-fabric-covered cantilever low wings are detachable for transport or storage. It has a glide ratio of 20:1. The landing gear is conventional and the cruciform tail is strut-braced. The aircraft was originally designed to allow removal of one wing without the other dropping, to facilitate single-person disassembly.

Construction time from the kit is estimated at 200 hours.

Specifications (Cumulus)

See also

References

External links
Company website archives on Archive.org
Photo of Cumulus in flight
 Cumulus page on All-Aero, plus specifications and performance data

1990s United States sailplanes
Bowlus aircraft
Cruciform tail aircraft
Motor gliders
Aircraft first flown in 1995
Single-engined pusher aircraft
Low-wing aircraft